The Narrabeen group of sedimentary rocks occurs in the Sydney Basin in eastern Australia. This series of rocks was formed in the Triassic Period.

Geology
It includes various rock types including lithic sandstone, quartz sandstone, siltstones, claystones, conglomerate and shales, some of which have fossils of plants and fish. Partly in these rocks plants, fish and amphibious animals are petrified.

The red and green shales of the Narrabeen Group are water-tight over the sandstone bodies and the shale of Bald Hill, which forms the top layer of the Narrabeen Group, forms a regional water-barrier layer. 

Over the Narrabeen Group, the younger stratigraphic formation of Hawkesbury sandstones accumulated.

Structure
Above the Narrabeen group is the younger less fertile Hawkesbury sandstone. Below are Permian sedimentary rocks including measures of coal broadly known as the Illawarra Coal Measures.

Whereabouts
The Narrabeen group is most famously seen as The Three Sisters in the Blue Mountains. It can also be seen in various places in the Sydney Basin, such as Long Reef near Narrabeen, and at sea level around Broken Bay.

See also
 Sydney Basin
 Ashfield Shale
 Banks Wall Sandstone
 Burra-Moko Head Sandstone
 Mount York Claystone
 Munmorah Conglomerate
 Terrigal Formation
 Newport Formation (NSW)
 Garie Formation
 Bulgo Sandstone
 Bald Hill Claystone
 Scarborough Sandstone
 Geology of New South Wales
 Geography of Sydney

References

 http://australianmuseum.net.au/The-Sydney-Basin
 https://web.archive.org/web/20090916073705/http://www.vnc.qld.edu.au/enviro/bluemtns/blue-b.htm

Geologic groups of Oceania
Geologic formations of Australia
Triassic Australia
Geology of New South Wales